Rezaabad may refer to:

Alborz Province
 Rezaabad, Alborz, a village in Nazarabad County, Alborz Province, Iran
 Rezaabad-e Sufian, a village in Savojbolagh County, Alborz Province, Iran

Ardabil Province
 Tazeh Kand-e Rezaabad, a village in Ardabil County

Fars Province
Rezaabad, Eqlid, a village in Eqlid County
Rezaabad, Kazerun, a village in Kazerun County
Rezaabad, Naqsh-e Rostam, a village in Marvdasht County

Golestan Province
 Rezaabad, Golestan, a village in Ramian County

Ilam Province
 Rezaabad, Ilam, a village in Ilam County, Ilam Province, Iran

Kerman Province
Rezaabad, Anar, a village in Anar County
Rezaabad, Mashiz, a village in Bardsir County
Rezaabad 1, a village in Kahnuj County
Rezaabad, Kerman, a village in Kerman County
Rezaabad, Ekhtiarabad, a village in Kerman County
Rezaabad, Azadegan, a village in Rafsanjan County
Rezaabad, Khenaman, a village in Rafsanjan County
Rezaabad, Rudbar-e Jonubi, a village in Rudbar-e Jonubi County

Kermanshah Province

Khuzestan Province
 Rezaabad, Khuzestan, a village in Masjed Soleyman County

Kurdistan Province
 Rezaabad, Kurdistan, a village in Bijar County

Lorestan Province
 Rezaabad, Borujerd, a village in the Central District of Borujerd County
 Rezaabad, Oshtorinan, a village in Oshtorinan District, Borujerd County
 Rezaabad, Delfan, a village in Delfan County
 Rezaabad, Khorramabad, a village in Khorramabad County
 Rezaabad, Doab, a village in Selseleh County
 Rezaabad, Yusefvand, a village in Selseleh County
 Rezaabad-e Mian Volan, a village in Selseleh County
 Rezaabad-e Reza Veys, a village in Delfan County

Markazi Province
 Rezaabad, Khomeyn, a village in Khomeyn County
 Rezaabad, Saveh, a village in Saveh County
 Rezaabad, Shazand, a village in Shazand County

Mazandaran Province
 Rezaabad, Mazandaran, a village in Savadkuh County

North Khorasan Province
 Rezaabad, Howmeh, a village in Shirvan County
 Rezaabad, Ziarat, a village in Shirvan County

Razavi Khorasan Province
Rezaabad-e Sarhang, a village in Chenaran County
Rezaabad-e Taheri, a village in Chenaran County
Rezaabad-e Gijan Samedi, a village in Chenaran County
Rezaabad-e Sharqi, a village in Quchan County
Rezaabad, Razavi Khorasan, a village in Torbat-e Jam County

Semnan Province
Rezaabad, Semnan, a village in Shahrud County

Tehran Province

Yazd Province
 Rezaabad, Khatam, a village in Khatam County
 Rezaabad, Mehriz, a village in Mehriz County

Zanjan Province
 Rezaabad, Zanjan, a village in Zanjan County

See also
Raziabad (disambiguation)
Rizaabad (disambiguation)